Juan Santisteban Troyano (born 8 December 1936) is a Spanish retired football midfielder and manager.

Honours

Player
Real Madrid
Intercontinental Cup: 1960
European Cup: 1956–57, 1957–58, 1958–59, 1959–60
Spanish League: 1956–57, 1957–58, 1960–61, 1963–64
Latin Cup: 1957

Manager
Spain U23
Mediterranean Games: 2005

Spain U19
UEFA European Under-19 Football Championship: 2007

Spain U17
UEFA European Under-17 Football Championship: 2007, 2008, Runner-up 2003, 2004
FIFA U-17 World Cup: Runner-up 1991, 2003, 2007

Spain U16
UEFA European Under-16 Football Championship: 1991, 1997, 1999, 2001, Runner-up 1992, 1995

External links
 
 
 National team data 
 
 
 
 NASL profile

1936 births
Living people
Footballers from Seville
Spanish footballers
Association football midfielders
La Liga players
Real Madrid Castilla footballers
Real Madrid CF players
Real Betis players
Serie A players
Venezia F.C. players
National Professional Soccer League (1967) players
Baltimore Bays players
North American Soccer League (1968–1984) players
Spain international footballers
Spanish football managers
Real Madrid Castilla managers
Spain national under-21 football team managers
Spanish expatriate footballers
Expatriate footballers in Italy
Expatriate soccer players in the United States
UEFA Champions League winning players
Spanish expatriate sportspeople in the United States